Cockroaches of the sea may refer to:

 Ligia oceanica, an isopod also known as a "sea slater"
 Ligia exotica, an isopod also known as a "sea roach"
 Lobster, a family of marine crustaceans
 Prawn, a family of crustaceans
 Shrimp, decapod crustaceans
 A description of minke whales by whaling official Masayuki Komatsu

Animal common name disambiguation pages